Kordia zosterae is a Gram-negative and rod-shaped bacterium from the genus of Kordia which has been isolated from the seaweed Zostera marina from the Yellow Sea in Korea.

References

Flavobacteria
Bacteria described in 2017